Khagendra Nath Mahata is an Indian politician from All India Trinamool Congress. In May 2021, he was elected as the member of the West Bengal Legislative Assembly from Gopiballavpur (Vidhan Sabha constituency).

Personal life
Mahata is from Jhargram. His father's name is Tarendra Nath Mahata. He has passed MBBS From R.G. Kar Medical College in 2007.

Political life
He has been elected as the member of the West Bengal Legislative Assembly from Gopiballavpur (Vidhan Sabha constituency).He has won the election.

References

Trinamool Congress politicians from West Bengal
West Bengal MLAs 2021–2026
Year of birth missing (living people)
Living people